The Night Angel is a 1931 American pre-Code drama film written and directed by Edmund Goulding. The film stars Nancy Carroll, Fredric March, Phoebe Foster, Alison Skipworth and Alan Hale, Sr. The film was released on July 18, 1931, by Paramount Pictures.

Cast
Nancy Carroll as Yula Martini
Fredric March as Rudek Berken
Phoebe Foster as Theresa Masar
Alison Skipworth as Countess von Martini
Alan Hale, Sr. as Biezel
Hubert Druce as Vincent
Katherine Emmet as Mrs. Berken
Otis Sheridan as Schmidt
E. Lewis Waller as Kafka
Clarence Derwent as Rosenbach
Charles Howard as Clown
Doris Rankin as Matron
Francine Dowd as Mitzi
Cora Witherspoon as Head Nurse
Francis Pierlot as Jan

References

External links 
 

1931 films
American drama films
1931 drama films
Paramount Pictures films
Films directed by Edmund Goulding
American black-and-white films
1930s English-language films
1930s American films